Kevin (Kiev) Connolly, a producer, composer, songwriter, sound engineer, and musician with over twenty years of experience in the industry..

Born in Ballymote, Sligo on 5th April 1956, Kiev (Kevin) Connolly has been writing songs, playing guitar and keyboard, and performing since finishing school in Cork.  In 1978 he moved to Germany performing in folk clubs in Stuttgart and Heidelberg. Moving to West Berlin in 1979, he became fluent in German, studied Music Theory at the Hochschule der Kunstler, and took a Sound Engineering Course, Recordland Studios, West Berlin. He went on to form the pop music group The Missing Passengers, securing a recording contract with Arista/Ariola, Munich. Achieving success with two original albums in the European Charts. In 1985 the group performed Kiev's hit song "Did She Tell You" on both the Extratour program Radio Bremen/ARD, and the Musik Convoy program on WDR/ARD.
In 1989 Kiev Connolly and The Missing Passengers represented Ireland at the Eurovision Song Contest in Lausanne, Switzerland with Kiev's song The Real Me. Yugoslavia won the Eurovision Song Contest that year.

In 2000 Kiev established Feature Music Studios. The Studio offers a complete Sound Design package including Dialogue, Music, Sound Effects, and Foley recording, editing and mixing. For many years he has been arranging and producing the Wolfe Tones' live performances and albums; including one of their top selling albums "You'll Never Beat the Irish".  He arranged, produced and played keyboards for the following Wolfe Tone events: 'Into The Light' – The 1916 Commemoration Concert 'LIVE' at Citywest Hotel Dublin, 26–28 March 2016, The Wolfe Tones-1916 Commemoration Concert at City Hall, 1 May 2016 (this event was very significant for Kiev as his grandfather Sean Connolly was shot on the roof of the City Hall on Easter Monday 1916), and The Wolfe Tones Fest '55' Citywest Hotel, Dublin, 29–31 December 2017, where they are presenting three unique performances, culminating in what promises to be the biggest New Year's Eve Hooley in Ireland,

Kiev also performs regularly with his very popular two-man wedding band "The UpSideDown Band.

References

Living people
Irish pop singers
Irish record producers
Irish songwriters
Eurovision Song Contest entrants for Ireland
Eurovision Song Contest entrants of 1989
Year of birth missing (living people)